Jake Arteaga (born February 2, 2000) is an American soccer player who plays as a midfielder for LA Galaxy II.

Club career
Arteaga made his professional debut in a 1–1 draw with Orange County SC. He replaced Adrian Vera after 66 minutes.

Arteaga committed to playing college soccer for the University of Portland.

References

External links
 
 
 Jake Arteaga at US Soccer
 Jake Arteaga at the University of Portland

2000 births
Living people
People from Glendora, California
Soccer players from California
University of Portland alumni
American soccer players
United States men's youth international soccer players
Association football defenders
USL Championship players
LA Galaxy players
LA Galaxy II players
Portland Pilots men's soccer players